The Marmorhaus (English: Marble House) is a former cinema located on the Kurfürstendamm in Berlin. Opened in 1913, it takes its name from a large marble façade. Designed by the architect Hugo Pál, the walls of the foyer and auditorium were decorated by the expressionist artist Cesar Klein.

During the silent era it frequently functioned as a venue for premieres of new films. These included The Cabinet of Dr. Caligari, Johannes Goth, The Woman in Heaven, The Head of Janus, Genuine, Four Around a Woman, Wandering Souls,  and The Haunted Castle.

Owned by the giant UFA company for many years, it was later developed into a multiplex. In 2001 the cinema was closed and the property sold off.

References

Bibliography
 Hardt, Ursula. From Caligari to California: Erich Pommer's life in the International Film Wars. Berghahn Books, 1996.
 Kreimeier, Klaus. The Ufa Story: A History of Germany's Greatest Film Company, 1918-1945. University of California Press, 1999.

Cinemas and movie theaters in Berlin
Former cinemas
Cinemas in Germany